"We Got Us" is a song co-written and recorded by American country music singer Canaan Smith. Smith co-wrote the song with Stephen Barker Liles and Tommy Lee James.

Critical reception
Matt Bjorke of Roughstock gave the song a positive review, saying that "Vocally, Canaan has a strong tenor as he sings lyrics which discuss a man who knows times may be hard for him and his new love but with love as their anchor, they’re ready to take the leap and make a commitment to each other and that despite having nothing but each other, that love will be enough to pull them through any tough times they’ll encounter along the way.

Music video
The music video was directed by Brian Lazzaro and premiered in January 2012.

Chart performance

References 

2012 songs
2012 singles
Canaan Smith songs
Mercury Nashville singles
Songs written by Tommy Lee James
Song recordings produced by Brett Beavers
Songs written by Canaan Smith